Illia Yaremenko, Ілля Сергійович Яременко (born 14 July 1997) is a Ukrainian Paralympic swimmer. He represented Ukraine at the 2016 and 2020 Summer Paralympics.

Career
Yaremenko represented Ukraine in the men's 50 metre freestyle S12 event at the 2016 Paralympic Games and won a bronze medal. He again represented Ukraine in the men's 50 metre freestyle S12 event at the 2020 Paralympic Games and won a silver medal.

References

1997 births
Living people
Ukrainian male freestyle swimmers
Sportspeople from Kyiv
Paralympic swimmers of Ukraine
Medalists at the World Para Swimming European Championships
Medalists at the World Para Swimming Championships
Paralympic medalists in swimming
Paralympic silver medalists for Ukraine
Swimmers at the 2016 Summer Paralympics
Swimmers at the 2020 Summer Paralympics
Medalists at the 2016 Summer Paralympics
Medalists at the 2020 Summer Paralympics
S12-classified Paralympic swimmers
21st-century Ukrainian people